Henry Cromwell-Williams (22 June 1625 – 3 August 1673) of Bodsey House, Huntingdonshire was an English politician who sat in the House of Commons  variously between 1654 and 1673.

Cromwell-Williams was born as Cromwell, the son of Henry Cromwell (1586–1657) of Ramsey, Huntingdonshire. He matriculated from Magdalene College, Cambridge. He succeeded to his father's Ramsey estate in 1657 but sold it in 1664.

In 1654, Cromwell was elected Member of Parliament for Huntingdonshire in the First Protectorate Parliament. He was re-elected in 1656 for the Second Protectorate Parliament and in 1659 for the Third Protectorate Parliament.

In 1660, he took the name Williams to become Cromwell-Williams. He was elected MP for Huntingdonshire in the Convention Parliament  and was re-elected in 1661 for the Cavalier Parliament. He sat until his death in 1673 at the age of 48. 

He was a Gentleman of the Privy Chamber from 1671 until his death.
 
Cromwell-Williams married his cousin Anne Cromwell, the daughter of Richard Cromwell of Upwood, but had no children.

References

1625 births
1673 deaths
Alumni of Magdalene College, Cambridge
People from Ramsey, Cambridgeshire
Gentlemen of the Privy Chamber
English MPs 1654–1655
English MPs 1656–1658
English MPs 1659
English MPs 1660
English MPs 1661–1679
Members of the Parliament of England (pre-1707) for constituencies in Huntingdonshire